Ed Warinner (born August 5, 1961) is an American football coach and former player who is currently the run game coordinator at Florida Atlantic University. He was most recently the offensive line coach for Michigan Wolverines football team. He also held assistant coaching positions for Army (1987–1999), Air Force (2000–2002), Kansas (2003–2004, 2007–2009), Illinois (2005–2006), Notre Dame (2010–2011), Ohio State (2012–2016), and Minnesota (2017). He won a national championship with Ohio State in 2014.

Personal life
Warinner and his wife, Mary Beth, have two daughters, Madisyn and Merideth, and a son, Edward, who plays football at Miami (OH).

References

1961 births
Living people
Akron Zips football coaches
Akron Zips football players
Army Black Knights football coaches
Florida Atlantic Owls football coaches
Illinois Fighting Illini football coaches
Ohio State Buckeyes football coaches
Kansas Jayhawks football coaches
Michigan State Spartans football coaches
Michigan Wolverines football coaches
Minnesota Golden Gophers football coaches
Notre Dame Fighting Irish football coaches
University of Mount Union alumni
People from Tuscarawas County, Ohio